Probatio pennae (also written probatio pennę; in Medieval Latin; literally "pen test") is the medieval term for breaking in a new pen, and used to refer to text written to test a newly cut pen.

A scribe would normally  test a newly cut pen to see if it wrote well by writing a few lines of text on a piece of blotting paper. Sometimes these blotting papers survived due to being used afterwards as book binding material; they often provide unique, less "serious" textual material that would otherwise have been lost. A famous example is "Hebban olla vogala", one of the first fragments of Dutch literature, which survived from a tenth-century probatio pennae.

References

Latin words and phrases
Writing